John Dalrymple (c. 1699 – 23 February 1742) was a Scottish member of parliament (MP) in the British Parliament.

He represented Wigtown Burghs 1728–1734.

References 

1699 births
1742 deaths
Members of the Parliament of Great Britain for Scottish constituencies
British MPs 1727–1734